Patricia Moon Ranson (January 1, 1937–November 4, 2011) was an American politician who served in the Kansas State Senate as a Republican from the 25th district from 1993 to 2000.

Biography 
Patricia Ranson was born on January 1, 1937, in Columbine, Wyoming. Upon graduating from high school in Independence, Kansas in 1954, Ranson entered the Independence Junior College and later transferred to the University of Kansas. She obtained a Bachelor of Science in Education in 1957.

After graduation, Ranson worked as a high school teacher and an administrative assistant for Governor Robert Bennett. She was elected to the Senate in 1992, and was re-elected in 1996.

References

1937 births
2011 deaths
Republican Party Kansas state senators
Women state legislators in Kansas
Politicians from Wichita, Kansas
20th-century American women politicians
20th-century American politicians
University of Kansas alumni